Ash-Tree Press is a Canadian company that publishes supernatural and horror literature.

The press has reprinted notable collections of ghostly stories by such writers as R. H. Malden, A. N. L. Munby, L. T. C. Rolt, Margery Lawrence, and Eleanor Scott. It also has published newly edited collections of supernatural tales by such writers as John Metcalfe, Marjorie Bowen, Vernon Lee, and Frederick Cowles, and it has produced multi-volume sets of the complete supernatural short stories of Sheridan Le Fanu, E. F. Benson, H. Russell Wakefield, Russell Kirk, and A. M. Burrage. In 2001, the press published a collected edition of M. R. James's ghost stories and related writings.

In addition, Ash-Tree Press has published new collections of stories by contemporary authors and a series of original anthologies. Awards for these include the 2002 British Fantasy Award for best collection for After Shocks by Paul Finch and the 2004 International Horror Guild Award and 2005 World Fantasy Award for the anthology Acquainted with the Night, edited by Christopher and Barbara Roden.

Ash-Tree Press itself has received the 1997 Special Award, Non-Professional, from the World Fantasy Awards and the 1999 Specialty Press Award of the Horror Writers Association.

Christopher and Barbara Roden are the proprietors of both Ash-Tree Press and Calabash Press; the latter publishes fiction and nonfiction related to Sherlock Holmes.

References

Further reading
Michael Dirda, "Ghost Stories", Washington Post, Oct. 31, 2004, p. BW15.

External links
Ash-Tree Press
Complete title list
Book publishing companies of Canada
Small press publishing companies
Horror book publishing companies